The Leisure center of ILOA Les Rives de Thiers is a leisure centre located in Thiers in the department of Puy-de-Dôme in the region Auvergne-Rhône-Alpes. The leisure center is the largest of Auvergne with more than 70 hectares (0.7 km²).

Open largely in the middle of 1980s, several buildings were stopped building in 1989. The leisure center is installed between the Dore river, the RD44 (Department Road) and the railroad line of Clermont-Thiers-Boën. The whole site is protected by the European network Natura 2000 and by the Livradois-Forez Regional Natural Park.

Gallery

References

External links
 Base de Loisirs en Auvergne
 FR8301032 - Zones alluviales de la confluence Dore-Allier 

Sports venues in Puy-de-Dôme
Sports venues completed in 1989
1989 establishments in France